Fernando Magalhães (February 18, 1878 – January 10, 1944) was a Brazilian obstetrician who was twice President of the Academia Brasileira de Letras.

1878 births
1944 deaths
Brazilian obstetricians
Brazilian academics